The Institution of Occupational Safety and Health (IOSH) is a global organisation for health and safety professionals, based in UK.

Structure

IOSH is the chartered professional body for health and safety in the workplace. It acts as a champion, supporter, adviser, advocate and trainer for those who protect the safety, health and wellbeing of others.

IOSH has around 48,000 members, from over 130 countries. This includes an extensive trainer network who deliver well known courses including Leading Safely, Managing Safely and Working Safely. Over 179,000 delegates attended IOSH training courses in 2016.

History
IOSH was founded in 1945 when the Institution of Industrial Safety Officers (IISO) was formed as a division of the Royal Society for the Prevention of Accidents (RoSPA). The Institution gained its charitable status in 1962 and continues to operate as a not-for-profit organisation.

In 1981, the IISO was renamed as the Institution of Occupational Safety and Health (IOSH), and in 2002 was awarded a Royal Charter. From 2005, IOSH began awarding Chartered Safety and Health Practitioner status to recognise individual professionalism and commitment to continued learning and development.

In 2011 along with other health and safety bodies in the UK, IOSH developed the Occupational Safety & Health Consultants Register (OSHCR) to raise awareness and promote the use of certified health and safety consultants in the workplace.

IOSH's work

No Time to Lose 
IOSH’s No Time to Lose campaign was launched in 2014 to highlight the causes of occupational cancer and help businesses take action. The No Time to Lose website provides a host of free resources and information on workplace cancer, and offers the opportunity to sign a pledge to make changes and support the campaign.

Occupational Health Toolkit 
The Occupational Health Toolkit (OH Toolkit) is a free resource to help tackle common occupational health problems such as skin disorders, work related stress and non-work related conditions including diabetes and heart disease. The toolkit brings together information, guidance, case studies and training materials.

Guides and research reports
As part of their charitable work, IOSH produce a number of guides, such as Safe Start Up guides which are designed to help small business with health and safety. IOSH also fund and produce a number of research reports.

Consultations 
IOSH regularly post consultations, where members can respond and have the opportunity to influence national and international policies.

IOSH Blueprint 
IOSH Blueprint is a framework designed to measure skills and competencies in occupational safety and health. The tool is currently in a beta testing stage. IOSH members, and a number of select organisations, are using the self-assessment tool to identify training and development needs.

IOSH Training and Skills 
IOSH Training and Skills is a range of courses designed for different aspects of occupational health and safety. The courses are delivered by IOSH licensed trainers. Trainers must have suitable qualifications and experience before being approved to run IOSH courses.
 Leading Safely
 Managing Safely and Managing Safely Refresher
 Working Safely
 Environment for Business
 Fire Safety for Business and Fire Safety for Managers.
Managing Safely and Working Safely courses are also available in Arabic.
IOSH tailored courses are developed by licensed training providers to meet the demands of specialist industry sectors, roles or skills. They are assessed and approved by IOSH to make sure they meet IOSH’s standards.

IOSH recently launched their own level 3 certificate, NCFE IOSH Level 3 General Certificate in Safety and Health for Business, which offers a more direct route to IOSH membership.

Publications
 Policy and Practice in Health and Safety - A peer-reviewed journal published twice a year
 IOSH Magazine - A bi-monthly magazine on safety, health and wellbeing in the world of work
 Books - Publications for professionals
 Guidance and research - A number of documents are available free from the website.

Membership and designations
Categories of membership depend on a combination of academic qualifications, experience and achievement.

Chartered fellow (CFIOSH)
Chartered Fellows of the Institution are entitled to use the designation Chartered Safety and Health Practitioner and the designatory letters CFIOSH. This is the highest grade. Chartered Fellows must have demonstrated an outstanding contribution to the discipline and profession of health and safety. All Chartered Fellows are required to maintain a Continuing Professional Development (CPD) record.

Chartered member (CMIOSH)
Chartered Members of the Institution are entitled to use the designation Chartered Safety and Health Practitioner and the designatory letters CMIOSH. Chartered Member status requires approved educational qualifications, experience and should complete Initial Professional Development (IPD) Includes Skill Development Portfolio, Open Assessment and Peer Review interview. All Chartered Members are required to maintain a Continuing Professional Development (CPD) record.

Graduate member (Grad IOSH)
Members with Approved qualifications eg. NEBOSH Diploma, NVQ Level 6, MSc etc Will be awarded Graduate Member status of the Institution and they can use the designatory letters Grad IOSH. They are academically qualified to become Chartered Members, and are undergoing professional development.

Technical member (Tech IOSH)
Technical Members of the Institution are entitled to use the designatory letters Tech IOSH. They require approved educational qualifications like NEBOSH General Certificate, NVQ Level 3,NCRQ L3 etc, plus professional experience. They are required to continue in professional development.

Affiliate member
Affiliate level is for those who have an interest in, or are employed in occupational safety and health but are not yet eligible to join at other categories of membership.

Student member 
IOSH has recently launched a student membership category which lets OSH students join IOSH for free for the duration of their studies.

References

External links
 Official IOSH website
 No Time to Lose
 IOSH Magazine
 Health and safety Jobs careers site
 OSH Knowledge Project

Occupational safety and health organizations
Occupational Safety and Health
Organizations established in 1945
Safety organizations
1945 establishments in the United Kingdom
Oadby and Wigston
Organisations based in Leicestershire
Health and safety in the United Kingdom